The 2018 PDC Players Championship consisted of 22 darts tournaments on the 2018 PDC Pro Tour.

Prize money
The prize money for the Players Championship events remained at 2017 levels, with each event having a prize fund of £75,000.

This is how the prize money is divided:

February

Players Championship 1
Players Championship 1 was contested on Saturday 17 February 2018 at the Barnsley Metrodome in Barnsley.

Players Championship 2
Players Championship 2 was contested on Sunday 18 February 2018 at the Barnsley Metrodome in Barnsley.

March

Players Championship 3
Players Championship 3 was contested on Saturday 10 March 2018 at the Barnsley Metrodome in Barnsley.  hit a nine-dart finish against .

Players Championship 4
Players Championship 4 was contested on Sunday 11 March 2018 at the Barnsley Metrodome in Barnsley.

Players Championship 5
Players Championship 5 was contested on Saturday 17 March 2018 at the Arena MK in Milton Keynes.

Players Championship 6
Players Championship 6 was contested on Sunday 18 March 2018 at the Arena MK in Milton Keynes.  hit a nine-dart finish against .

April

Players Championship 7
Players Championship 7 was contested on Saturday 7 April 2018 at the Barnsley Metrodome in Barnsley.  hit a nine-dart finish against .

Players Championship 8
Players Championship 8 was contested on Sunday 8 April 2018 at the Barnsley Metrodome in Barnsley.

Players Championship 9
Players Championship 9 was contested on Saturday 28 April 2018 at the Robin Park Tennis Centre in Wigan.

Players Championship 10
Players Championship 10 was contested on Sunday 29 April 2018 at the Robin Park Tennis Centre in Wigan.

May

Players Championship 11
Players Championship 11 was contested on Saturday 19 May 2018 at the Arena MK in Milton Keynes.

Players Championship 12
Players Championship 12 was contested on Sunday 20 May 2018 at the Arena MK in Milton Keynes.

June

Players Championship 13
Players Championship 13 was contested on Saturday 16 June 2018 at the Robin Park Tennis Centre in Wigan.

Players Championship 14
Players Championship 14 was contested on Sunday 17 June 2018 at the Robin Park Tennis Centre in Wigan.

Players Championship 15
Players Championship 15 was contested on Tuesday 26 June 2018 at the Barnsley Metrodome in Barnsley.

Players Championship 16
Players Championship 16 was contested on Wednesday 27 June 2018 at the Barnsley Metrodome in Barnsley.  hit a nine-dart finish against .

September

Players Championship 17
Players Championship 17 was contested on Tuesday 4 September 2018 at the Barnsley Metrodome in Barnsley.  and  hit nine-dart finishes against  and  respectively.

Players Championship 18
Players Championship 18 was contested on Wednesday 5 September 2018 at the Barnsley Metrodome in Barnsley.

Players Championship 19
Players Championship 19 was contested on Friday 28 September 2018 at the Citywest Hotel in Dublin.  and  hit nine-dart finishes against  and  respectively.

Players Championship 20
Players Championship 20 was contested on Saturday 29 September 2018 at the Citywest Hotel in Dublin.  hit a nine-dart finish against .

October

Players Championship 21
Players Championship 21 was contested on Saturday 20 October 2018 at the Barnsley Metrodome in Barnsley.  hit a nine-dart finish against .

Players Championship 22
Players Championship 22 was contested on Sunday 21 October 2018 at the Barnsley Metrodome in Barnsley.  hit a nine-dart finish against .

References

2018 in darts
2018 PDC Pro Tour